Lobocheilos rhabdoura is a species of fish in the family Cyprinidae found in Asia.

References

Fish of Thailand
Cyprinid fish of Asia
Fish described in 1934
Labeoninae